Kurijan or Kuri Jan or Koorijan may refer to:
 Kuri Jan, Gilan
 Kurijan, Hamadan